Air service may refer to:
 Airline, a form of air transport services for passengers or freight, generally with a recognized operating certificate or license
 Sherut Avir, the air force of the Haganah and the forerunner of the Israeli Air Force
 United States Army Air Service, (1918-1926) forerunner of U.S. Air Force